Macluritidae is an extinct family of relatively large, Lower Ordovician to Devonian, macluritacean gastropods(?), hypserstrophically coiled, that is dextral while appearing sinistral, of which the genus Maclurites is arch-typical.  The base of their shells is flat or gently protruding while the upper side is generally concave.

Taxonomy 
J.B Knight, et al., 1960 included the Macluritidae in the prosobranch Archeogastropoda and included the family in the Macluritacea. Linsely and Keir, 1984 removed the Macluritidae, along with the Onychochilidae, to the Paragastropoda, a new class of gastropod-like molluscs proposed for forms which they concluded had untorted bodies.

Bouchet & Rocroi, 2005, tentatively included the Macluritidae within the Gastropoda, placing them among Paleozoic molluscs with anisostrophically coiled shells of uncertain position (Gastropoda?) and within the superfamily Macluritoidea.   This family has no subfamilies.

Genera 
Genera in the family Macluritidae include:
 Bridgeina
 Maclurina
 Macluritella - synonym: Prohelicotoma.
 Maclurites Lesueur, 1818 - type genus of the family Macluritidae - synonyms: Paramaclurites, Coelocentrus, Mitrospira, Polyenaulus.
 Monitorella
 Palliseria
 Rousseauspira
 Scaevogyra
 Teiichispira
 Zhuozishanospira

See also 
The Taxonomy of the Gastropoda (Bouchet & Rocroi, 2005)

References 

Prehistoric gastropods
Taxa named by Philip Pearsall Carpenter